Abrikosovy is a rural locality (a settlement) in Zelenolugskoye Rural Settlement of Martynovsky District, Rostov Oblast, Russia. The population of Abrikosovyy was 427 as of 2010. There are 8 streets.

Geography 
Abrikosovy is located 43 km northwest of Bolshaya Martynovka (the district's administrative centre) by road. Zelenolugsky is the nearest rural locality.

References 

Rural localities in Rostov Oblast